Jakob Grob (born 28 March 1939) is a Swiss rower who competed in the 1968 Summer Olympics.

He was born in Obstalden.

In 1968 he was a crew member of the Swiss boat which won the bronze medal in the coxed fours competition.

External links
 profile

1939 births
Living people
Swiss male rowers
Olympic rowers of Switzerland
Rowers at the 1968 Summer Olympics
Olympic bronze medalists for Switzerland
Olympic medalists in rowing
Medalists at the 1968 Summer Olympics